The Members Exchange (MEMX) is an independently owned, technology-driven stock exchange founded by members to serve the interest of its founders and their collective client base. The founding members, which include nine major financial organizations, claim they seek to transform markets around the goals of transparency, innovation, and competition in order to align exchange services with the interests of market participants. It is a member-formed equities trading platform, and competes with the major equity exchanges: NYSE, Nasdaq, and CBOE.

History
MEMX was founded in early 2019 by a group of nine banks, financial services firms, market makers, and retail broker-dealers: BofA Securities, Charles Schwab Corporation, Citadel LLC, E-Trade, Fidelity Investments, Morgan Stanley, TD Ameritrade, UBS, and Virtu Financial. MEMX has also received investments from nine other financial services firms since its conception, including BlackRock, Citigroup, J.P. Morgan, Goldman Sachs, Wells Fargo, and Jane Street. MEMX was founded to deliver a lower cost, more transparent exchange platform that has the end-user in mind.

SEC Approval
MEMX received approval from the Securities and Exchange Commission in May 2020 to operate as a national securities exchange. The exchange launched on September 21, 2020, listing seven symbols and rolling out additional names through October 2020.

Operating Principles
The mission of the exchange is "to increase competition, improve operational transparency, reduce fixed costs and simplify the execution of equity trading in the U.S.” Initially after launch, MEMX is not charging for market data or connectivity.

Key People
Jonathan Kellner, Chief Executive Officer 
Dominick Paniscotti, Chief Technology Officer 
Thomas Fay, Chief Operating Officer
Colin Clark, Head of Business Development
Lindsay Stone Gilliam, Chief People Officer 
Anders Franzon, General Counsel
Louise Curbishley, Chief Financial Officer
Nick Ciarleglio, Head of Member Experience 
Sophie Sohn, Head of Marketing and Communications

References

External links 

 Official Website

Financial services companies established in 2019
Stock exchanges in the United States
American companies established in 2019
Companies based in Jersey City, New Jersey
Financial services companies based in New Jersey